Zhukovsky (masculine), Zhukovskaya (feminine), or Zhukovskoye (neuter) is the name of several inhabited localities in Russia.

Urban
 Zhukovsky, Moscow Oblast, a city under the oblast jurisdiction in Moscow Oblast

Rural
 Zhukovsky, Chelyabinsk Oblast, a settlement in Stepnoy Selsoviet of Verkhneuralsky District of Chelyabinsk Oblast
 Zhukovsky, Oryol Oblast, a settlement in Bolshekolchevsky Selsoviet of Kromskoy District of Oryol Oblast
 Zhukovsky, Stavropol Krai, a khutor in Novomayaksky Selsoviet of Novoselitsky District of Stavropol Krai
 Zhukovsky, Nikitinsky Selsoviet, Kumylzhensky District, Volgograd Oblast, a khutor in Nikitinsky Selsoviet of Kumylzhensky District of Volgograd Oblast
 Zhukovsky, Sulyayevsky Selsoviet, Kumylzhensky District, Volgograd Oblast, a khutor in Sulyayevsky Selsoviet of Kumylzhensky District of Volgograd Oblast
 Zhukovskoye, a selo in Zhukovskoye Rural Settlement of Peschanokopsky District of Rostov Oblast
 Zhukovskaya, Ivanovo Oblast, a village in Puchezhsky District of Ivanovo Oblast
 Zhukovskaya, Rostov Oblast, a stanitsa in Zhukovskoye Rural Settlement of Dubovsky District of Rostov Oblast
 Zhukovskaya, Kharovsky District, Vologda Oblast, a village in Kumzersky Selsoviet of Kharovsky District of Vologda Oblast
 Zhukovskaya, Lokhotsky Selsoviet, Tarnogsky District, Vologda Oblast, a village in Lokhotsky Selsoviet of Tarnogsky District of Vologda Oblast
 Zhukovskaya, Shebengsky Selsoviet, Tarnogsky District, Vologda Oblast, a village in Shebengsky Selsoviet of Tarnogsky District of Vologda Oblast

See also
 Zhukovsky (disambiguation)